In the 2012 season of the Tajik League, 13 teams participated. Khosilot, Istaravshan, and Zarafshon, were newly promoted, while Shodmon Ghissar withdrew from the competition. There was a limit of eight foreign players per team, with up to five on the field at a particular time. Only Parvoz Bobojon Ghafurov had the maximum of eight foreign footballers.

The Tajikistan clubs' participation was upgraded from the AFC President's Cup to the AFC Cup starting in 2013 by the AFC, so two clubs (league champions and cup winners) went on to participate in the 2013 AFC Cup.

Teams

League table

Results

Top goal-scorers
The top scorers were:

Hat-tricks

 4 Player scored 4 goals
 5 Player scored 5 goals
 6 Player scored 6 goals

References

External links
Football federation of Tajikistan

Tajikistan Higher League seasons
1
Tajik
Tajik